In Major League Baseball, the winning pitcher is defined as the pitcher who last pitched prior to the half-inning when the winning team took the lead for the last time. There are two exceptions to this rule. The first is that a starting pitcher must complete five innings to earn a win (four innings for a game that lasts five innings on defense). If he fails to do so, he is ineligible to be the winning pitcher even if he last pitched prior to the half-inning when his team took the lead for the last time, and the official scorer awards the win to the relief pitcher who, in the official scorer's judgment, was the most effective. The second exception applies if the relief pitcher who last pitched prior to the half-inning when the winning team took the lead for the last time was "ineffective in a brief appearance" in the official scorer's judgment, in which case the win is awarded to the succeeding relief pitcher who, in the official scorer's judgment, was the most effective.

Charles Radbourn holds the record for the most wins in a single-season, winning 60 games in 1884. John Clarkson (53 in 1885) and Guy Hecker (52 in 1884) are the only other pitchers to win more than 50 games in a single-season.

Key

List

See also

Baseball statistics
List of Major League Baseball career wins leaders
List of Major League Baseball annual wins leaders
300 win club

References

External links
Baseball-Reference

Major League Baseball records
Major League Baseball lists